Nandigram, also known by ancient name Bharatkund, is a village in Sohawal tehsil in Ayodhya district in the Indian state of Uttar Pradesh, India. During the exile of Lord Ram, King Bharat ruled from Nandigram instead of the kingdom's capital Ayodhya. Nandigram is 19 km south of district headquarters Ayodhya city.

The pincode of Nandigram is 224202, Nandigram comes under Bharatkund post office. As of 2011 census of India, population of the village was approximately 1500.

Transport

Road 
Nandigram is very close to Faizabad - Sultanpur NH 330 therefore there is a good road connectivity with nearby cities and towns from Nandigram, Ayodhya. Faizabad, Ayodhya, Gonda, Sultanpur, Akbarpur, Pratapgarh, Allahabad, Balrampur are the nearby cities connected well with Nandigram, Ayodhya. Bhadarsa, Bikapur, Masodha, Tarun, Haiderganj, Chaure Bazar, Goshainganj, Sohawal, Milkipur, Kumarganj, Rudauli, Kurebhar, Bhiti are the nearby towns  also good connected with Nandigram, Ayodhya.

Railway 
The nearest railway station to reach Nandigram is Bharat Kund Railway Station which is located near to Nandigram, Ayodhya. Faizabad Junction (Ayodhya Cantt), Ayodhya Junction, Goshainganj, Rudauli, Sultanpur Junction, Akbarpur Junction are the nearby railway stations to reach Nandigram, Ayodhya.

Air 
Ayodhya Airport, Chaudhary Charan Singh Airport (Lucknow) and  Allahabad Airport are the nearby airports from Nandigram, Ayodhya.

Schools and colleges
M. J. S. Academy School, Bharatkund.

See also
Bharat Kund Railway Station

References

 Villages in Faizabad district